The UNAF U-20 Tournament is a football (soccer) tournament held between nations who are members of the UNAF association, however some other teams which are not members are invited.

Summary

 A round-robin tournament determined the final standings.

Successful national teams

See also 
 UNAF U-23 Tournament
 UNAF U-20 Tournament
 UNAF U-17 Tournament
 UNAF U-15 Tournament

External links 
 Tournoi UNAF U18 Alexandrie 2019 - frmf official website]

 
UNAF competitions
Under-18 association football